Pantelis Chatzidiakos (Greek: Παντελής Χατζηδιάκος; born 18 January 1997) is a Greek Dutch professional footballer who plays as a centre-back for Eredivisie club AZ and the Greece national team.

Club career

AZ
In January 2015, Pantelis Chatzidiakos, who moved from Panathinaikos to AZ as a youth in 2011, signed a three-year professional contract with the Dutch team. Chatzidiakos made his debuts with the club in both the Champions League and the Europa League matches. In the past, he was crowned Dutch champion with the AZ U16. In 2017 he helped Jong AZ win the title in Tweede Divisie and achieve promotion to Eerste Divisie.

He made his debut in the club, along with his first appearance in Eredivisie in a 2–1 away loss against PEC Zwolle as a substitute in the second half.
On 3 December 2017, the 20-year-old Greek international central defender, scored his first goal in the Eredivisie, in a 2–0 away win against VVV-Venlo. He sealed the win in the 84th minute "With an excellent shot at the height of the area, and this is not the first goal of his career, as he scored in the KNVB Cup against MVV Maastricht in September." With this victory, Alkmaar reached 6 consecutive wins in the League.
He started the 2018–19 season as the undisputed leader of the AZ's defence. On 12 August 2018, he scored his first goal for the season, with a right footed shot from very close range to the top left corner, after Oussama Idrissi's assist in a 5–0 home win game against NAC Breda. 

On 2 November 2019, he scored his first goal for the 2019–20 season with a right footed after an assist from Owen Wijndal in a triumphic 3–0 home win game against FC Twente. On 7 November 2019, he lashed a thunderous effort high into the left corner, scoring his first goal in the UEFA Europa League in a hammering 5–0 away win against FC Astana.
On 28 November 2019, Chatzidiakos suffered the dreaded anterior cruciate ligament injury while on UEFA Europa League game for AZ Alkmaar, medical tests have confirmed. Chatzidiakos was included in the AZ starting line-up to face Partizan Belgrade at home in the Europa League, but he was forced off in the 53rd minute with a knee injury. Subsequent medical tests this morning confirmed that the talented 22-year-old defender suffered the anterior cruciate ligament injury and will return to action after a period of at least six months. 

On 7 February 2020, Alkmaar announced the extension of the contract with the Greek international until the summer of 2024, being rewarded for his excellent performances despite the serious injury he suffered last November. On 11 March 2021, he suffered from a knee injury, and further research has shown that the Greek international does not have to hope for a quick return and may not even take action this season.

International career
As a result of his exceptional performances he was called in the Greece U-21 team from Antonis Nikopolidis for the 2019 UEFA European Under-21 Championship qualification match against San Marino and Czech Republic on 22 and 27 March 2018 respectively.

Chatzidiakos made his first appearance with the Greece senior national team on 12 October 2019, in the game against Italy in Rome, for the Euro 2020 Qualifiers. The young defender was a starter for Greece and played the whole 90 minutes in his debut for the team.

Personal life
Chatzidiakos was born in Rhodes to a Greek father and a Dutch mother.

Career statistics

International

Honours

Individual
Eredivisie Team of the Month: September 2022

References

External links
 Career stats - Voetbal International
 
 
 
 

1997 births
Living people
People from Rhodes
Association football midfielders
Greek footballers
Greece youth international footballers
Greece under-21 international footballers
Greece international footballers
Dutch footballers
Netherlands youth international footballers
Greek emigrants to the Netherlands
Dutch people of Greek descent
Eredivisie players
AZ Alkmaar players
Sportspeople from the South Aegean